The women's 1000 metres speed skating competition of the 2014 Sochi Olympics was held at Adler Arena Skating Center on 13 February 2014.

Qualification
A total of thirty-six speed skaters could qualify for this distance, with a maximum of four skaters per country. The top 20 of the 2013–14 ISU Speed Skating World Cup – Women's 1000 metres standings after the fourth World Cup race in Berlin secured a spot for their country. Then the additional 16 spots were awarded based on a time ranking of all times skated in the World Cup and the 2014 World Sprint Speed Skating Championships. A reserve list was also made.

Records
Prior to this competition, the existing world and Olympic records were as follows.

At the 2013 World Single Distance Speed Skating Championships the track record was set by Olga Fatkulina at 1:15.44.

The following record was set during this competition.

TR = track record

Results
The race was started at 18:00.

On 24 November 2017, Russian athlete Olga Fatkulina was disqualified for a doping offence. In January 2018, she successfully appealed against the disqualification at the court of arbitration for sport.

TR = track record, DQ = disqualified

References

Women's speed skating at the 2014 Winter Olympics